Marzocchi is an Italian manufacturer founded in 1949 by brothers Stefano and Guglielmo Marzocchi. The company profile doesn't include hydraulic industrial pumps anymore but only suspension components for motorcycles and bicycles. The Marzocchi Pompe is still in the hands of the Marzocchi Family and produces gear pumps and motors in Bologna. In 2008 the company was acquired by American automotive parts manufacturer Tenneco. Until 2007, Marzocchi manufactured the mountain bike suspension forks in Italy. In order to remain competitive, Marzocchi, like RockShox before it, moved the production of the forks to Taiwan. In the 4th quarter of 2015, Fox Factory acquired certain assets of Marzocchi's mountain bike product lines.

Motorcycle suspension

Up until the 1980s, Marzocchi were original equipment manufacturers ('OEM') for a number of Italian motorcycle marques including Moto Morini and Ducati, their oil shock absorbers also being OEM for Triumph Motorcycles in the latter stages of their production at the Meriden plant. Their later 'Strada' model introduced a degree of air suspension to motorcycling and, like the oil shocks, were available as aftermarket fittings for a large number of models. Strada units were OEM for Triumph's T140LE Royal Wedding and TSS models.  A big advantage of the Marzocchi shock was its ability to be rebuilt, seal kits and service manuals being readily available. Meriden also experimented with using Marzocchi front forks which were also used on some Italian models. Meriden however closed down before any such forks reached production models.

Marzocchi shocks, albeit of more modern design, are still OEM for a number of manufacturers.

Bicycle suspension
Until 2007, fork production was based in Italy (apart from the entry level OEM parts, which are produced by the Taiwanese SR Suntour in Taiwan). Since 2008, all forks have been made in Taiwan.

*Notable models

Marzocchi Monster Triple (1999-2005)

Marzocchi Super Monster Triple (2003-2005)

Marzocchi Shiver (2001-2005)

Marzocchi Z1 (1996)

Marzocchi RAC (2001)

Marzocchi 66RC (2005)

See also

Shock absorber
Motorcycle suspension
List of motorcycle suspension manufacturers
List of bicycle parts
 List of Italian companies

References

External links
Official site
Official site for motorcycle suspension

Auto parts suppliers of Italy
Automotive motorsports and performance companies
Cycle suspension manufacturers
Cycle parts manufacturers
Manufacturing companies established in 1949
Italian companies established in 1949
Italian brands

Motorcycle parts manufacturers